Delocoma is a monotypic moth genus of the family Erebidae. Its only species, Delocoma marmorea, is found in Sulawesi. Both the genus and the species were first described by Charles Swinhoe in 1905.

References

Calpinae
Monotypic moth genera